2078 is an adventure story arc of the Philippine comic strip series Pugad Baboy, created by Pol Medina, Jr. and originally published in the Philippine Daily Inquirer in 1992. This particular story arc lasts 45 strips long. In 1994, the story arc was reprinted in PB5, the fifth book compilation of the comic strip series.

Synopsis
The Pugad Baboy gang waits in line at a Line 1 station. Because of their combined weight, their LRT car breaks off the train and runs right into a black hole that is a time warp. The car suddenly stops and the group alights at the same LRT station, which is now in a decrepit condition. A black-suited man calling himself Taxx Vader (a combined spoof of Darth Vader and a tax evader) tells the group that they are in the future - 2078 to be exact. A friend of Taxx Vader's, Chewbaboy (spoofing Chewbacca) then offers to act as the group's tour guide in the Manila of 2078.

Among the developments and changes they discover are the following:
 The Manila Line 1 ceased operating in the year 2064
 Ninoy Aquino International Airport had been renamed Tan Yu International Airport.
 Bien-Bien Roxas became President in 2028.
 Mandarin has replaced Filipino as the national language.
 Arabs now use the Philippines as a rest and recreation base before returning to their jobs as contract workers in Japan - oil supplies in the Middle East have been exhausted for years.
 The Japanese had bought the entire United States and turned it into a gigantic golf course with the Americans as their caddies.
 The US President is an African-American woman.
 The heavyweight boxing champion of the world is only nine years old.
 Quiapo is now known as the Gilbert-Willie Yu District.
 The scarcity of water (a bottle of water costs as much as a bag of blood due to inflation) caused the production of beer to stop.
 Medical science has advanced to the point where coin-operated CAT scan machines exist, animal organs can be transplanted into humans, and human cloning can be arranged.
 Inflation has driven the Philippine peso to such stratospheric levels that even a simple pair of shoes can cost millions each.
 Flyovers dominate the main thoroughfares of Metro Manila.
 The Philippines' population is more than 800 million.
 The Philippine Daily Inquirer is now sold in microchip format with a comic strip made by PM the Fifth (a reference to strip creator Pol Medina Jr.)

Dobermaxx
All of a sudden, the sound of gunfire causes the group to scamper for cover. Chewbaboy identifies the culprit as a member of Black Eden, a gang of drug pushers operating in the city. The pusher passes right in front of Polgas, who was assembling his OCB-issue Garapata Gun and kicked the criminal's legs out from under him. The Black Eden gang member tries to shoot back at him with his laser pistol, but a shot from somewhere else ruins his aim but also immolates Polgas' own Garapata Gun. Polgas is surprised to observe that the mysterious shooter also used a Garapata Gun. The newcomer introduces himself as Dobermaxx, the OCB director in 2078.

Dobermaxx explains that the captured pusher is named Adam Carlo, and that the drug he was selling was known as "Blue Emerald", smuggled into the country by grinding the drug crystals into powder and applied as underarm deodorant. Dobermaxx also remarks that Polgas looks familiar; he mentions Agent Polgas by name. Polgas decides to hide his true identity calling himself "Jun." The pair get into Dobermaxx's ride, presumably a Porsche variant similar to Polgas' Thunderdog code-named the Bullfox II and proceeded to his office after incarcerating Adam Carlo. They begin to discuss OCB personnel files, equipment and the drug pushers. Dobermaxx explains that the Black Eden gang's mastermind is a shadowy figure named Anton Damien who had three clones as his lieutenants - Adam Alfred, Adam Berto and the prisoner, Adam Carlo. Dobermaxx adds that Agent Polgas' grandson, another OCB agent, was missing and presumed dead when he intentionally crashed the heli-jet he was piloting in order to kill Adam Berto.

Just then, Dobermaxx receives a transmission that the cell block in which Adam Carlo is being kept is under attack - an escape attempt is being made. He attaches a jet pack to his Dingo Suit powered armor and rushes off while Polgas takes the Jet Jackal, the OCB's VTOL craft. Seeing Dobermaxx respond, Adam Carlo goes to the top of the cell block and shoots him down with his laser cannon before Polgas crashes the Jackal on the platform, killing him. Polgas bails out and lands right into a furious Anton Damien, who proceeds to beat him up while wearing his own power suit. In the midst of the struggle, Polgas successfully bites into Anton Damien's power suit and short-circuits the whole system. Without the empowerment of the suit, Polgas moves on to pummel Anton Damien.. Polgas  removes the suit's helmet and is stunned to see his 20th-century nemesis Atong Damuho, but who was in reality, Atong Damuho's great-grandson. Both Dobermaxx and Anton Damien wonder at this strange turn of events.

Return from 2078
Chewbaboy appears and shouts that the black hole at the Line 1 station is opened once again, allowing Polgas to finally return to his own time. When Polgas insists on seeing Anton Damien sent to jail first, Chewbaboy explains that he has to leave or wait 23 more years for another black hole to open. Anton Damien mocks Polgas' predicament by wagging his tongue. It only infuriates Polgas by getting Dobermaxx's Garapata Gun and shoots several rounds at Anton Damien's face, triggering an unbearable itch. Chewbaboy, Dobermaxx and Polgas run to the Line 1 station and sees the black hole beginning to close. Dobermaxx hotwires an old power cable to his Dingo Suit and throws Polgas into the black hole, but not before Polgas makes him promise to find Agent Polgas' grandson. As Polgas enters the black hole before it closes completely, Dobermaxx removes his helmet and reveals himself to be actually the missing grandson of Agent Polgas, calling him lolo (Filipino - grandfather).

Epilogue
The Pugad Baboy group finally arrives back in 1992 aboard the same Line 1 car, but now have no memory of their adventures in 2078. They wonder why Polgas lies spread-eagled on the box-car's rear windshield. They also notice that his Garapata Gun looked different and that it now shoots at longer range. The OCB Weapons and Armaments laboratory analyzes the weapon, but could not determine the exact kind of metal used in its construction, but notes its built-in laser sight, a satellite transceiver, and an etching engraved on the trigger housing - "Dobermaxx". Since his memory of the events of 2078 had been erased, Polgas could only speculate on where the new Garapata Gun came from and decides to adopt "Dobermaxx" as his new OCB callsign.

Cultural references
 One of Pol Medina, Jr.'s running gags involves the contention that Chinese businessmen would soon own everything in the country, hence the inclusion of Tan Yu and his family in this story arc. Tan Yu is a very successful if reclusive businessman born of Chinese immigrants from Fujian. He made his first million at only eighteen years of age and is now considered to be one of Asia's richest men with properties in the Philippines, Taiwan, China and the United States. His daughter, Emilia "Bien-Bien" Roxas, runs Tan Yu's main company, Asia Internationale Group.
 Gilbert C. Yu and Willie C. Yu are the founders of G&W Architects, Engineers, Project Development Consultants, an architectural firm established in 1971 and responsible for the construction of over  1000 buildings.
 References to science-fiction films are abound in the 2078 story arc. Aside from the Star Wars Taxx Vader and Chewbaboy spoofs, an Imperial Stormtrooper could barely be seen in one of the panels. RoboCop is also present in another panel.
 The fact that 2078 Manila is swarming with flyovers is a stab at the Aquino administration's construction of the Ortigas Interchange during the early 1990s.
 Chewbaboy's revelation of Arabs working as contract employees is a "reversal" of Overseas Filipino Workers often going to jobs in the Middle East and Japan.
 In a strip immediately preceding 2078 in PB5, an author's note reveals that the Pugad Baboy gang went to 2078 on the day of the 1992 Philippine presidential elections and came back one week later in real time. Dagul claims to Doc Sebo that they were gone for several weeks.
 In the aftermath of the series, the other Pugad Baboy villagers went to buy ropes, after being shocked that Senator Cabalfin won the election as Senator, hinting mass suicide.

Footnotes

Pugad Baboy